Pijush Nag is an Indian trade unionist. As of 2013, he was the Tripura State Committee secretary of the Centre of Indian Trade Unions (CITU).

References

Trade unionists from Tripura
Living people
Year of birth missing (living people)